Mutulu Shakur (born Jeral Wayne Williams; August 8, 1950) is an American activist and former member of the Black Liberation Army, sentenced to sixty years in prison for his involvement in a 1981 robbery of a Brinks armored truck in which a guard and two police officers were murdered.

Shakur was politically active as a teen with the Revolutionary Action Movement (RAM) and later the black separatist movement the Republic of New Afrika. He was the stepfather of slain actor and rap artist Tupac Shakur.

On November 10, 2022, the United States Parole Commission granted Shakur's release on parole, effective December 16, 2022. The Commission noted that Shakur's terminal illness ensured that he was not a threat to commit another crime.

Life

Early life
Shakur was born in Baltimore, Maryland, on 8 August 1950, as Jeral Wayne Williams. At age seven he moved to Jamaica, Queens, New York City with his mother, who was blind, and younger sister.

Activism
By his late teens, Shakur was politically active with the Revolutionary Action Movement (RAM) and later joined the Republic of New Afrika.

In 1970, Shakur began working with the Lincoln Detox program, which offered drug rehabilitation to heroin addiction using acupuncture — instead of the FDA-approved drug methadone.  Eventually he became the program's assistant director and remained associated with the program until 1978.  He became certified and licensed to practice acupuncture in the State of California in 1979. He went on to help found and direct the Black Acupuncture Advisory Association of North America (BAAANA) and the Harlem Institute of Acupuncture.

Brink's robbery, arrest and incarceration
Shakur was one of several Black Liberation Army members to carry out the 1981 robbery of an armored car. Aided by the May 19 Communist Organization and former members of the Weather Underground, the BLA crew stole $1.6 million in cash from a Brink's armored car at the Nanuet Mall, in Nanuet, New York, killing a Brink's guard, Peter Paige, seriously wounding another Brinks guard, Joseph Trombino, and subsequently killing two Nyack police officers, Edward O'Grady and Waverly Brown (the first black member of the Nyack, New York, police department). Trombino recovered from the wounds he received in this incident, but was killed in 2001 in the September 11 attacks.

Shakur, the alleged ringleader of the group, evaded capture for six years and thus was the last one to go on trial on charges related to the robbery. In the 1980s, Shakur and Marilyn Buck were indicted on Racketeer Influenced and Corrupt Organizations Act (RICO) charges. While at large, on July 23, 1982, he became the 380th person added to the FBI Ten Most Wanted Fugitives list. He was arrested on February 12, 1986, in California by the FBI. Shakur and Buck were tried in 1987 and convicted on May 11, 1988.

Although federal parole was abolished pursuant to the Sentencing Reform Act of 1984, Shakur's convictions were exempt because the Act's provisions did not take effect until 1987. Thus, under the rules in effect at the time of his conviction, he was due for a mandatory parole determination after serving thirty of his original sixty-year sentence, which came in 2016. However, the United States Parole Commission denied his release in 2016, 2018, and early 2022. On November 10, 2022, the Commission reconsidered and granted Shakur release on parole effective December 16, 2022, in light of his declining health. Shakur was in fact released on December 16, 2022.

During his incarceration, Shakur founded a New York-based organization named Dare 2 Struggle which released a tenth-anniversary tribute album for Tupac Shakur called A 2Pac Tribute: Dare 2 Struggle in 2006 through music industry veteran Morey Alexander's First Kut Records and Canadian activist Deejay Ra's Lyrical Knockout Entertainment. The album features artists such as Mopreme Shakur, Outlawz, and Imaan Faith. As Shakur explains it, the CD was created in order to motivate, inspire, and challenge black people to struggle against their obstacles. He also recorded a radio PSA for Deejay Ra's "Hip-Hop Literacy" campaign, encouraging reading of books about Tupac. Shakur was interviewed in the Oscar-nominated documentary Tupac: Resurrection, in which he described how he wrote a "Thug Life Handbook" with Tupac, expressing an anti-drug and anti-violence message.

Personal life
Shakur is the father of Mopreme, Nzingha, Chinua, and Ayize Shakur.

In 1975, he married Afeni Shakur— mother of Tupac Shakur. They had a daughter, Sekyiwa. They divorced in 1982.

In October 2019, Shakur renewed his quest for a reduction of sentence by applying for compassionate release, but relief was once again denied.

In June 2022, it was revealed that Shakur has terminal bone marrow cancer with "six months to live".

See also
Assata Shakur

References

External links
 Dope Is Death (79'), by Mia Donovan, a film about the legacy of a 1970s coalition of New York community activists and revolutionaries, including the now-imprisoned Mutulu Shakur, and how they created North America's first acupuncture detox clinic. 
"Dare to Struggle" music compilation's website
Family and Friends of Mutulu Shakur's website
ThugLifeArmy.com interview with Shakur
VIBE news article
Jericho Movement's "Children of Political Prisoners Speak Out," Recorded June 13, 2020 and posted on YouTube on August 24, 2020.

1950 births
American Black separatist activists
African-American people
American bank robbers
American people convicted of robbery
American people convicted of murdering police officers
Black Liberation Army
Fugitives
Inmates of ADX Florence
Living people
Members of the Black Liberation Army
People convicted of racketeering
People from Baltimore
Shakur family